Voyage of the Damned is a 1976 drama film directed by Stuart Rosenberg, with an all-star cast featuring Faye Dunaway, Oskar Werner, Lee Grant, Max von Sydow, James Mason, and Malcolm McDowell.

The story was inspired by actual events concerning the fate of the ocean liner  carrying Jewish refugees from Germany to Cuba in 1939. It was based on a 1974 nonfiction book of the same title written by Gordon Thomas and Max Morgan-Witts. The screenplay was written by Steve Shagan and David Butler. The film was produced by ITC Entertainment and released by Rank Film Distributors in the UK and Avco Embassy Pictures in the US.

Plot
Based on historic events, this dramatic film concerns the 1939 voyage of the German-flagged , which departed from Hamburg carrying 937 Jews from Germany, ostensibly bound for Havana, Cuba. The passengers, having seen and suffered rising antisemitism in Germany, realised this might be their only chance to escape. The film details the emotional journey of the passengers, who gradually become aware that their passage was planned as an exercise in propaganda, and that it had never been intended that they disembark in Cuba. Rather, they were to be set up as pariahs, to set an example before the world.  As a Nazi official states in the film, when the whole world has refused to accept the Jews as refugees, no country can blame Germany for their fate.

The Cuban government refuses entry to the passengers, and the liner heads to the United States. As it waits off the Florida coast, the passengers learn that the United States also has rejected them, leaving the captain no choice but to return to Europe. The captain tells a confidante that he has received a letter signed by 200 passengers saying they will join hands and jump into the sea rather than return to Germany.  He states his intention to run the liner aground on a reef off the southern coast of England, to allow the passengers to be rescued and reach safety there.

Shortly before the film's end, it is revealed that the governments of Belgium, France, the Netherlands, and the United Kingdom have each agreed to accept a share of the passengers as refugees. As they cheer and clap at the news, footnotes disclose the fates of some of the main characters, suggesting that more than 600 of the 937 passengers, who did not resettle in Britain but in the other European nations, ultimately were deported and were murdered in Nazi concentration camps.

Cast

 Faye Dunaway as Denise Kreisler
 Max von Sydow as Captain Schroeder
 Oskar Werner as Professor Egon Kreisler
 Malcolm McDowell as Max Gunter
 Orson Welles as José Estedes
 James Mason as Dr. Juan Remos
 Lee Grant as Lili Rosen
 Katharine Ross as Mira Hauser
 Ben Gazzara as Morris Troper
 Luther Adler as Professor Weiler
 Michael Constantine as Luis Clasing
 Denholm Elliott as Admiral Canaris
 José Ferrer as Manuel Benitez
 Lynne Frederick as Anna Rosen
 Helmut Griem as Otto Schiendick
 Julie Harris as Alice Fienchild
 Wendy Hiller as Rebecca Weiler
 Paul Koslo as Aaron Pozner
 Nehemiah Persoff as Mr. Hauser
 Fernando Rey as President Bru
 Leonard Rossiter as Commander Von Bonin
 Maria Schell as Mrs. Hauser 
 Victor Spinetti as Dr. Erich Strauss
 Janet Suzman as Leni Strauss
 Sam Wanamaker as Carl Rosen
 Keith Barron as Purser Mueller
 Ian Cullen as Radio Officer
 David Daker as First Officer
 Brian Gilbert as Laurenz Schulman
 Constantine Gregory as Navigation Officer (credited as Constantin de Goguel)
 Georgina Hale as Lotte Schulman
 Don Henderson as Engineering Officer
 Bernard Hepton as Milton Goldsmith
 Anthony Higgins as Seaman Berg
 Donald Houston as Dr. Glauner
 Frederick Jaeger as Werner Mannheim
 David de Keyser as Joseph Joseph
 Della McDermott as Julia Strauss
 Günter Meisner as Robert Hoffman (credited as Guenter Meisner)
 Jonathan Pryce as Joseph Manasse
 Marika Rivera as Madame in Bordello
 Ina Skriver as Singer
 Milo Sperber as Rabbi
 Philip Stone as Secretary
 Adele Strong as Mrs. Schulman
 Genevieve West as Sarah Strauss
 Laura Gemser as Estedes' friend (uncredited)

Production

The book was published in 1974. The Los Angeles Times called it "a human document of rare and discerning power". The book was a best seller, and the authors earned an estimated £500,000 from it.

Rights to the book were acquired in 1974. It was originally envisioned as an ABC Movie of the Week but its budget of $7.3 million was too expensive.

The film was the first feature of Associated General Films.

Dunaway was paid $500,000 plus a percentage of the profits.

The movie was filmed on board the chartered Italian ocean liner Irpinia, which was fitted with two false funnels in order to resemble St. Louis. It was also shot on location in Barcelona, Spain (standing in for Cuba), St. Pancras Chambers in London, and at the EMI Elstree Studios in Borehamwood, Hertfordshire.

Actual death toll

The true death toll is uncertain. The 1974 book that was the basis of the film estimated a much lower number of deaths. By using statistical analysis of survival rates for Jews in various Nazi-occupied countries, Thomas and Morgan-Witts estimated the fate of the 621 St. Louis passengers who were not given refuge in Cuba or the United Kingdom (one died during the voyage): 44 (20%) of the 224 refugees that settled in France likely were murdered in the Holocaust, 62 (29%) Holocaust murders amongst the 214 that reached Belgium, and 121 (67%)  Holocaust murders amongst the 181 that settled in the Netherlands, for a total of 227 (37%) of the refugees that came under occupation were likely murdered by the Nazis. In 1998, Scott Miller and Sarah Ogilvie of the United States Holocaust Memorial Museum traced the survivors from the voyage, concluding that a total of 254 refugees or 40.9 percent were murdered by the Nazis.

Release
The film opened on 22 December 1976 in four theatres in New York and Los Angeles.

Box office
According to Lew Grade who helped finance the film, the movie "should have done better" at the box office. He wrote in his memoirs "I thought it was one of the most moving and important films I'd seen in a long time.  I just couldn't understand why it didn't become a success" adding that "strangely enough, it did outstanding business in Japan."

German TV

French TV

Dutch TV

Italian TV

Alternate version
The complete, uncut version of the film was 182 minutes long. It was released only once, on the Magnetic Video label in 1980.

Awards and nominations

Soundtrack

The film score was composed, arranged and conducted by Lalo Schifrin and the soundtrack album was released on the Entr'Acte label in 1977.

Track listing

Personnel
 Lalo Schifrin - arranger, conductor
 London Studio Orchestra

See also
 Jewish refugees
 Ship of Fools

References

External links

 
 
 
 

1974 books
1976 films
1976 drama films
American drama films
British drama films
Embassy Pictures films
Films based on non-fiction books
Films directed by Stuart Rosenberg
Films featuring a Best Supporting Actress Golden Globe-winning performance
Films scored by Lalo Schifrin
Films set in 1939
Films set in Hamburg
Films set in Havana
Films set on ships
Films shot at EMI-Elstree Studios
Films shot in Barcelona
Holocaust films
History books about the Holocaust
International response to the Holocaust
ITC Entertainment films
Jewish emigration from Nazi Germany
Seafaring films based on actual events
1970s English-language films
1970s American films
1970s British films